Li Xiaqing or Lee Ya-Ching (16 April 1912 – 28 January 1998), also known by her stage name Li Dandan, was a Chinese film actress, pioneering aviator, and philanthropist. She was the first Chinese woman to be granted a civil aviation license in China, in 1936, and also co-founded its first civilian flying school. As an actress, she starred in Romance of the Western Chamber, and played the lead in an early adaptation of Mulan for the screen. Lee Ya-Ching is an Anglicized version of her Chinese name.

Aviator 
At the age of sixteen, Li witnessed an airshow in Paris, which left a strong impression on her. In 1943, looking back on the start of her flying career, she explained that she had been troubled by Japanese aggression towards China and decided that she could best serve her country through flying. Li began training at the Contran École d'Aviation in Switzerland, where she was the first female student to receive a pilot's license.  

In 1935, she enrolled in the Boeing School of Aviation in Oakland, California for advanced training. Later that year, she returned to China, where she was commissioned by the Chinese government to make a 30,000 mile survey of potential air routes.  Li also helped found the Shanghai Municipal Air School and worked there as a flight instructor until civilian flights were grounded.

Filmography

 The God of Peace (1926) - Lin Cuiwei
 Why Not Her (1926) - Kong Qiongxian
 A Wandering Songstress (1927) - Li Lingxiao
 A Poet from the Sea (1927) - Liu Tsan Ying
 Romance of the Western Chamber  (1927) - Hongniang
 Five Avenging Women (1928)
 Mulan Joins the Army (1928) - Hua Mulan
 Don't Change Your Husband (1929)
 Disputed Passage (1939) - Aviatrix (credited as Ya-Ching Lee)

See also
 Fung Joe Guey
 Hazel Ying Lee
 Hilda Yen
 John Huang Xinrui
 Kwon Ki-ok

References

External links
 China's First Lady of Flight, airspacemag.com. Accessed 31 October 2022.
 Li Xiaqing, Aviatrix and Actress, forgottennewsmakers.com (3 May 2010). 
 
 Profile, dianying.com. Accessed 31 October 2022.

1912 births
1998 deaths
Actresses from Guangdong
Chinese aviators
Women aviators
Chinese emigrants to the United States
Chinese women aviators
20th-century Chinese actresses
Chinese silent film actresses
Chinese film actresses
People from Haifeng County
Chinese women philanthropists
Chinese philanthropists
20th-century philanthropists
20th-century women philanthropists